Halo is an unincorporated community located in Floyd County, Kentucky, United States.

The origin of the name "Halo" is obscure.

References

Unincorporated communities in Floyd County, Kentucky
Unincorporated communities in Kentucky